The second season of the black comedy slasher television series Scream Queens aired on Fox. Fox renewed the series for a second season on January 15, 2016. It premiered on September 20, 2016 and concluded on December 20, 2016. The season consists of 10 episodes.

Emma Roberts, Abigail Breslin, Billie Lourd, Lea Michele, Keke Palmer, Niecy Nash, Glen Powell, Oliver Hudson and Jamie Lee Curtis reprise their roles from the previous season. John Stamos, Taylor Lautner, James Earl and Kirstie Alley were added to the main cast. Unlike the first season, which took place in a sorority house, the second season takes place in a hospital.

On May 15, 2017, Fox announced the cancellation of the series, making this the final season of the show until Ryan Murphy announced that a third season had begun production in May 2020.

Plot
After the events at Wallace University, Dean Cathy Munsch becomes a global icon and purchases the C.U.R.E. Institute in order to reform America's health care system and to cure incurable diseases. Hester confesses her crimes, leading to the Chanels' release from prison. However, the Chanels remain hated in the nation. Cathy then casts two doctors — Dr. Cassidy Cascade and Dr. Brock Holt — to fulfill the mission of the hospital, and installs Zayday Williams and the Chanels as medical students. Meanwhile, flashbacks to 1985 show the hospital's dark past, as a new serial killer surfaces: the Green Meanie.

Cast and characters

Main
 Emma Roberts as Chanel Oberlin
 Kirstie Alley as Nurse Ingrid Hoffel
 Taylor Lautner as Dr. Cassidy Cascade
 Lea Michele as Hester Ulrich / Chanel #6
 Abigail Breslin as Libby Putney / Chanel #5
 Keke Palmer as Zayday Williams
 Billie Lourd as Sadie Swenson / Chanel #3
 James Earl as Chamberlain Jackson
 John Stamos as Dr. Brock Holt 
 Jamie Lee Curtis as Dr. Cathy Munsch

Recurring
 Niecy Nash as Denise Hemphill
 Glen Powell as Chad Radwell
 Oliver Hudson as Weston "Wes" Gardner
 Trilby Glover as Jane Hollis
 Jerry O'Connell as Dr. Mike
 Laura Bell Bundy as Nurse Thomas
 Andy Erikson as Marguerite Honeywell / Chanel #7
 Riley McKenna Weinstein as Daria Janssen / Chanel #8
 Dahlya Glick as Andrea / Chanel #10

Special guest stars
 Colton Haynes as Tyler
 Brooke Shields as Dr. Scarlett Lovin

Guest
 Jeremy Batiste as Bill Hollis
 Cecily Strong as Catherine Hobart
 Kevin Bigley as Randal
 Brian Baumgartner as Richard
 Cheri Oteri as Sheila Baumgartner
 Alec Mapa as Lynn Johnstone
 Ivar Brogger as Mitch Mitchum
 Mary Birdsong as Penelope Hotchkiss
 Pablo Castelblanco as Tristan St. Pierre / Chanel Pour Homme
 Moira O'Neill as Addison / Chanel #9
 Cathy Marks as Midge / Chanel #11
 Amy Okuda as Anna Plaisance 
 Ray Fega as Slade Hornborn
 Bill Oberst Jr. as Clark

Episodes

Casting
In June 2016, John Stamos, Taylor Lautner and James Earl joined the cast of the series, portraying doctors and an employee at the hospital, respectively.

In July 2016, Colton Haynes and Cecily Strong were announced to guest star in the season. That same month, Jerry O'Connell and Laura Bell Bundy were announced to have recurring roles. In August 2016, it was announced Cheri Oteri would also guest star. In September 2016, Kirstie Alley was cast in the series. In November 2016, Brooke Shields was announced to guest star in the series.

Reception

Critical response
The second season of Scream Queens has received positive reviews, with critics labelling it a big improvement over the previous season. The review aggregator website Rotten Tomatoes reported an 83% approval rating with an average rating of 7.12/10 based on 6 reviews.

Ratings

References

External links

 
 

2016 American television seasons
Season 2